Roboastra tentaculata is a species  of sea slug, a polycerid nudibranch, a marine gastropod mollusc in the family Polyceridae.

Distribution
This species was described from Guam.

Etymology 
Tentaculata is used to describe Roboastra tentaculata due to the presence of oral tentacles. Oral tentacles allow sea slugs to move and obtain information from the environment.

Phylogeny 
In order for phylogenetic integrity, Roboastra tentaculata was moved into Roboastra from the genus Tambja.

Morphology 
The bulk of the sea slug body is green, along with bright yellow or orange stripes outlined with brown. Two green rhinophores with lamellae and rhinophoral cases are noticeable. This sea slug has green gills of two different sizes. Bright green oral tentacles are also found on the back of the organism, opposite of a straight green foot located on the bottom. Also present is a radula with smooth and large teeth. The digestive system is composed of salivary glands, an esophagus and an oral tube. R. tentaculata also have three reproductive duct structures; a hermaphroditic, vaginal and uterine duct. The first duct is hermaphroditic with an ampulla, vas deferens and a spiked penis. The second tract is composed of a small vaginal tube and a bursa copulatrix. The third duct contains a uterine tube and one oviduct.

References

Polyceridae
Gastropods described in 2005